Mercer Township is a township in Butler County, Pennsylvania, United States. The population was 1,100 at the 2010 census.

Geography
Mercer Township forms the northwestern border of Butler County, with Mercer County to the northwest and Venango County to the north. The township surrounds the borough of Harrisville but is a separate entity. The unincorporated community of Forestville is in the south.

Demographics

As of the census of 2000, there were 1,183 people, 473 households, and 333 families residing in the township.  The population density was 92.9 people per square mile (35.9/km2).  There were 503 housing units at an average density of 39.5/sq mi (15.3/km2).  The racial makeup of the township was 98.99% White, 0.51% African American, and 0.51% from two or more races. Hispanic or Latino of any race were 0.59% of the population.

There were 473 households, out of which 27.5% had children under the age of 18 living with them, 57.7% were married couples living together, 9.5% had a female householder with no husband present, and 29.4% were non-families. 23.7% of all households were made up of individuals, and 6.8% had someone living alone who was 65 years of age or older.  The average household size was 2.50 and the average family size was 2.97.

In the township the population was spread out, with 22.3% under the age of 18, 8.1% from 18 to 24, 30.4% from 25 to 44, 25.9% from 45 to 64, and 13.3% who were 65 years of age or older.  The median age was 39 years. For every 100 females there were 100.8 males.  For every 100 females age 18 and over, there were 99.8 males.

The median income for a household in the township was $35,000, and the median income for a family was $43,000. Males had a median income of $32,031 versus $18,571 for females. The per capita income for the township was $17,205.  About 6.9% of families and 11.2% of the population were below the poverty line, including 13.2% of those under age 18 and 6.1% of those age 65 or over.

References

Populated places established in 1797
Townships in Butler County, Pennsylvania